Aubérive is a commune in the Marne department in northeastern France.

Population

Geography
The commune is traversed by the Suippe river.

See also
Communes of the Marne department

References

Communes of Marne (department)